Talati and Partners LLP (TPA) is an Indian architecture and interior design firm based in Mumbai. The company was founded in 1975 by "Noshir D Talati" and "Nozer Panthaky". One of the oldest architecture firms in India, over the years TPA has grown considerably and has diversified its service offering to Project Management, Construction Supervision and Urban Design. The company is involved in residential and commercial projects, retail and entertainment centers, universities, airports and hospitals.

There are over 300 employees at Talati and Partners and the company is currently involved in work around India and the Middle East of approximately 45 million square feet.

Notable projects
 Palais Royale, Mumbai, India (under construction)
 JK House, Mumbai, India (under construction)
 Shirpur Technology, Nashik Maharashtra, India 2010
 Casa Grande, Mumbai India 2009
 Mumbai Airport, Terminal 1A, India, 2009
 Ceejay House, Mumbai, India, 2007
 Bombay Hospital Indore, India, 2006
 Inox Cinemas, Mumbai/Pune/Chennai/Hyderabad, India, 2003-2009
 Jindal Mansion, Mumbai India, 1991
 Cadbury House India, 1981

Awards
 ET Acetech Real Estate Awards for the Best Designer and Architect of the year 2010
 Century Ply and Aces of Spaces, Hall of Fame Award at the Architecture and Interiors India Awards 2010
 Economic Times ACE Awards for India's Leading Architect 2009
 Construction Source India & CNBC Awaaz-Award for Architecture & Design Excellence — Best Architect of the Year 2009
 Construction World Architect and Builders Awards for Top Ten Architects in India 2008
 Economic Times: ACE awards for India's Designer and Architect of the Year 2007
 Indian Institute of Interior Designers for Lifetime Achievement Award for Professional Excellence 2007
 Lifetime Achievement Award from Society Interiors (Durian) 2004
 American Alumni Association AAA Leadership award by U.S. Ambassador to India * H.E. Frank Wisner
 Hind Ratna Award for Outstanding Service Achievements and Contribution 1994
 Rashtriya Udyog Award by National Economic Forum for Architectural Achievement 1994
 National Unity Award for Outstanding Service Achievements and Contribution 1994
 Interiors Today Award for Excellence in Design and Architecture 1994
 Awarded Fellowship at Indian Institute of Interior Designers (I.I.I.D.) 1991
 Gold Medalist – Free Press Journal Award for Excellence in Designing

References

Architecture firms of India